Oliver Dziubak (born 30 March 1982 in Velbert, Germany) is a male javelin thrower from Australia. His personal best is 82.79 metres, achieved in February 2004 in Melbourne.

Dziubak won the bronze medal at the 2006 Commonwealth Games. In addition he competed at the 2004 Olympic Games without reaching the final.

Achievements

Seasonal bests by year
2000 - 63.17
2001 - 75.90
2002 - 70.93
2004 - 82.79
2005 - 78.97
2006 - 81.57
2007 - 75.21
2008 - 75.17

References

2006 Commonwealth Games profile

1982 births
Living people
Australian male javelin throwers
Athletes (track and field) at the 2004 Summer Olympics
Olympic athletes of Australia
Commonwealth Games medallists in athletics
Commonwealth Games bronze medallists for Australia
Athletes (track and field) at the 2006 Commonwealth Games
Medallists at the 2006 Commonwealth Games